The Command lit. is a 2005 Iranian film directed by Masoud Kimiai. It stars Poulad Kimiayi, Ezzatollah Entezami, Khosro Shakibai, Leila Hatami, Bahram Radan. It is the 25th film by Kimiai. The film tells the story of gangster relations in Iran and a love story between two former lovers.

Plot
Mohsen (Poulad Kimiayi) and Foroozandeh (Leila Hatami) are a former couple. They and Sahand (Bahram Radan), who is their friend, go to an Engineer manager's house to rob his safe. After that, they go to Reza Maroufi (Ezzatollah Entezami), an old retired gangster to take a fake passport for Foroozandeh. Mohsen and Forozandeh struggle in the way and Foroozandeh returns to Tehran. Maroufi and Sahand also come back to Maroufi's house in Tehran and they see Foroozandeh that is injured by Mohsen .....

The cast
Ezzatollah Entezami as Reza Maroufi
Khosro Shakibai as Had-e-Misagh
Leila Hatami as Foroozandeh
Poulad Kimiayi as Mohsen
Bahram Radan as Sahand
Merila Zarei as Darya
Jalal Pishvayian as Habib
Bahram Fattahi as Jalal

References

External links
Verdict (2005) in IMDb
A picture gallery at Soureh Cinema Website
Critical review at Cinemaema.com
Another review

Iranian crime films
2005 films
Films directed by Masoud Kimiai
Iranian romantic drama films